is a 1996 film based on the television Hissatsu series. The film depicts popular character Nakamura Mondo's death. Mondo is involved in Tokugawa shogunate's conflict.

Cast
 Makoto Fujita as Mondo Nakamura
 Kunihiko Mitamura as Hide
 Kiyoshi Nakajō as Yuji
 Chizuru Azuma as Okei

 Kin Sugai as Sen Nakamura
 Mari Shiraki as Ritsu Nakamura

 Masahiko Tsugawa as Seikichi
 Yuko Natori as Oyume
 Akira Takarada as Mizuno Tadakuni
 Seijun Suzuki as Hokusai

References

External links

1996 films
1990s adventure films
1990s Japanese-language films
Jidaigeki films
1990s Japanese films